Haboush is a surname. Notable people with the surname include:

JaHyun Kim Haboush (1940–2011), Korean-American historian
Jeffrey J. Haboush, American audio engineer
Joseph Haboush (born 1990), Lebanese footballer
William Haboush, American mathematician
Haboush's theorem